"I Believe I Can Fly" is a song written, produced, and performed by American singer R. Kelly from the soundtrack to the 1996 film Space Jam. It was originally released on November 26, 1996, and was later included on Kelly's 1998 album R. In early 1997, "I Believe I Can Fly" reached number two on the Billboard Hot 100. It also reached the number-one spot of the Billboard R&B Singles Chart and remained there for six non-consecutive weeks. Internationally, "I Believe I Can Fly" topped the charts in eight countries, including Ireland, the Netherlands, New Zealand, and the United Kingdom.

The song received five nominations at the 40th Annual Grammy Awards, winning Best Male R&B Vocal Performance, Best R&B Song, and Best Song Written for Visual Media, while losing Song of the Year and Record of the Year. It was ranked number 406 on Rolling Stones list of the 500 Greatest Songs of All Time in 2004. The music video was directed by Kelly with Hype Williams and designed by visual artist and designer Ron Norsworthy.

Background and composition
In a 2013 interview with The Boombox, R. Kelly was asked about the creative process behind the song: "When I met Michael Jordan on a basketball court at an athletic club — we hooped together in Chicago — he came to me and asked me if I wanted to do a song for his upcoming movie," Kelly said. "I was like, 'Yeah!' I didn't even ask what it was. [Eventually] he let me know what it was, we went to a screening to watch it and that's when I ended up coming up with 'I Believe I Can Fly'. I knew from the first melody that was gonna be the song that was gonna take me out of R&B and into another genre of music."

Critical reception
A writer for Associated Press described the song as "majestic" and "gospel-styled", noting that "hearing R. Kelly's booming voice reach a crescendo while backed up by a choir is a rousing performance that will get many replays". Larry Flick from Billboard wrote that it is "highly inspirational" and "embodying the mind-set of the two superstars [Michael Jordan and R. Kelly]". He added, ""If I can dream it, I can achieve it." A great motivator for the children who will flock to the silver screen for Jordan". A reviewer from Chicago Sun-Times viewed it as a "warm anthem". 

Ross Scarano from Complex said, "Like it or not, R. Kelly's "I Believe I Can Fly" works because of R. Kelly. There's not another singer alive with the same combination of ability, earnest conviction, and personal demons—demons that Kelly believes he needs the listener's support to fight." He added that the singer "calls on strings and a choir and every bit of strength available in his lungs and vocal chords to rise above the broad struggle described in the lyrics." David Browne from Entertainment Weekly opined that the "go-for-it lyrics and florid orchestration seem to have been written with a future Disney musical in mind." 

Tom Ewing of Freaky Trigger noted "I Believe I Can Fly"'s "genuine power as a redemption song" and also called it "the most convincing self-help song". British newspaper Lennox Herald picked it as the "undoubted highlight" of the Space Jam album". Thessa Mooji from Music & Media described it as a "dramatic ballad". Music Week rated it three out of five, calling it "a smoochy gospel-tinged ballad". They added, "A huge hit in the US and should ignite here." 

A reviewer for People Magazine labeled it as "schmaltzy but potent". Sunday Mirror rated it five out of ten, writing, "'I believe I can soar' sings R. Kelly but I suppose we should be thankful that he's released a proper song for once instead of those awful rap cover versions which are clogging up the charts these days. It's taken from the film Space Jam and if you bought Toni Braxton's last single and liked The Bodyguard then you will buy this for sure. I believe it will fly to the top of the charts though it makes me sore to say it." James L. Brown from USC Today deemed it a "long slow ballad".

Impact and legacy
In 2004, Rolling Stone ranked "I Believe I Can Fly" number 406 on their list of the 500 Greatest Songs of All Time. In 2012, Complex placed the song at number 24 in their ranking of The Best 90s R&B Songs.

Music video
The music video for "I Believe I Can Fly" was directed by Hype Williams. It begins at an old farm, where a young boy is playing with his ball. By the farm lies an autumn yellow cornfield, where R. Kelly starts singing. In another scene, a large screen by the farm are showing clips from Space Jam, while Kelly performs on the ground. Later in the video, the singer sits in an autumn forest. Behind him is the screen where the film's clips are displayed. In the last part of the video, Kelly conducts a large choir in a sports hall, accompanied by an orchestra. After Kelly has sung the last stanzas of the song, the choir claps as the video ends.

Track listing

Personnel
 Produced and arranged by R. Kelly
 Recorded by Stephen George at Battery Studios, Chicago
 Assistant recording engineers: Chris Brickley and Rick Behrens
 String Orchestra recorded by Carl Robinson at United Sound Systems – Studio A, Detroit
 Mixed by R. Kelly and Stephen George at Chicago Recording Co.
 Assistant mix engineer: Ron Lowe
 Programmed by R. Kelly and Stephen George
 Lead vocals: R. Kelly
 Background vocals: The Luv Club Choir, directed by Percy Bady
 Keyboard: Percy Bady
 Strings: Paul Riser and The Motown Romance Orchestra, led by Hart Hollman
 Executive producer: Barry Hankerson

Cover versions
 In 1997, former Wishbone star Mikaila covered "I Believe I Can Fly" on her second album "Dreams".
British pop singer Louisa Johnson covered this song on The X Factor (British series 12) in the final of the competition.  
In 2003, punk rock band Me First and the Gimme Gimmes covered the song for their album Take a Break. 
Pop singer William Hung recorded this song for his 2004 album Inspiration. 
Jazz saxophonist Marion Meadows also covered the song from the album Dressed to Chill.
Late singer James Ingram sang the song on his album Forever More (Love Songs, Hits & Duets) in 1999. 
R&B singer/actress Patti LaBelle sang the chorus of the song on her 1998 live album Live One Night Only as an addition to her signature tune "Over the Rainbow". 
Pop singer/actress Jessica Simpson sang the song on her DreamChaser Tour in 2001.
The song has also been covered by Jane McDonald, Irene Reid, Etta James, Yolanda Adams (in a duet with Gerald Levert), Ruth Brown, James Ingram, Ronan Keating, Bianca Ryan, and formerly of Woe, Is Me Tyler Carter.
American Idol candidates Katharine McPhee, Anwar Robinson, Aaron Kelly, Curtis Finch Jr., and Jacob Lusk all performed the song in different seasons of the TV show.
Gospel singer Yolanda Adams performed the song at the Ronald McDonald Concert for World Children's Day in 2003. She performed a duet with Kenny G in 2004 on his album At Last…The Duets Album.
The song was covered by Jermaine Paul on season 2 of The Voice.
The song was covered by Tim Olstad on season 3 of The X Factor.
The song was covered by Delvin Choice on season 6 of The Voice.
The song has been covered live by Faith No More in numerous tours, usually to segue into other songs.
The song has been covered live by James Carter's Organ Trio on Out of Nowhere.

In film and television

Other than appearing on the soundtrack for the film Space Jam, "I Believe I Can Fly" was performed by the school band in the 2002 film Drumline during the high school graduation ceremony of Devon Miles (played by Nick Cannon). 
In the computer-animated sequel film Ice Age 2: The Meltdown, Crash the possum sings the song after Manny catapults him with a tree before he crashes into another. 
In the 2003 film Good Boy!, Wilson briefly sings the song while diving into a pool. 
In the first-season episode of the television series Da Ali G Show, Ali G performs the song during the opening skit.
In the 2005 comedy Fun with Dick and Jane, Jim Carrey sings along with the song as it is played in an elevator. 
This song also appeared on the first American season of The X Factor, where R. Kelly performed "I Believe I Can Fly" for the first time as a duet with the eventual winner of the show is Melanie Amaro. 
This song was also performed on the singing competition series The Voice as the last solo song for the Season 2 winner Jermaine Paul.
In the Fox musical television series Glee, performed a version of the song in episode fourteen of season three, "On My Way" (aired on February 21, 2012). It is a mash-up track with the song "Fly" by Nicki Minaj featuring Rihanna.
In the comedy's third installment The Hangover Part III, Leslie Chow sings a 12-second portion of the song, while parachuting through Las Vegas.
In Red Velvet's Level Up Project, Wendy Shon sang the chorus while parasailing and riding on a speed boat in Pattaya, Thailand. She also sang the chorus in Level Up Project 2 in 2017-2018 and in Battle Trips Episode 103 while paragliding in Krems an der Donau, Austria.

Other performances
Kelly performed this song at the 40th Annual Grammy Awards.

In The TP-2.com Tour, Kelly performed a 10-minute long remix of "I Believe I Can Fly," which included dialogue from a priest, Kelly's mother, and God as characters. The remix was later featured on the bootleg release Loveland.

STS-122 crew heard this song on flight day 10 as a wake up call.

Since its release, it has become commonly associated with the NBA, most notably with Michael Jordan. The song also played at the conclusion of NBC's broadcast of the 1997 NBA Finals.

In addition to the NBA, the song also found use at other sporting events, most notably at Major League Baseball's New York Yankees home games during their four consecutive World Series runs from 1998 to 2001, the first three of which they won.

A version of the song, recorded by the Halifax community choir, was used as the backing track to a 2012 UK TV advertisement for the Halifax Bank.

On October 13, 2012, when the Space Shuttle Endeavour was being transferred from Los Angeles International Airport to the California Science Center through the streets of Los Angeles, the recording was played as the shuttle left The Forum, and the song was performed live by James Ingram later that day at Debbie Allen's live show celebrating the Endeavour's arrival at the corner of Crenshaw Blvd and Martin Luther King Blvd. (The shuttle was delayed over five hours in arriving there; to keep the crowd entertained, the performance went on only slightly delayed.)

Parodies
In the 1999 episode "The Best of Both Worlds" of the Nickelodeon animated television series KaBlam!, in the Life with Loopy segment, the song was spoofed as "I (Don't) Believe I Can Fly."
In the 2012 episode "Food Battle 2012" of the webseries Smosh, the song was spoofed as "I Believe I’m Able to Fly." It also appeared on the 2015 episode "EVERY CAT EVER".
In 2013, the song was parodied by sports radio show Tim & Sid, spoofing the song as "I Believe in Masai", in reference to Toronto Raptors General Manager Masai Ujiri.
In 2016, the song was parodied as "I'm Convinced I Can Swim" by "Art Smelly" from the soundtrack to the hit film Earth Jelly in an episode of Unbreakable Kimmy Schmidt.

Charts

Weekly charts

Year-end charts

Decade-end charts

Certifications

See also
List of number-one R&B singles of 1997 (U.S.)

References

1990s ballads
1996 singles
1996 songs
Grammy Award for Best Song Written for Visual Media
Music videos directed by Hype Williams
European Hot 100 Singles number-one singles
Irish Singles Chart number-one singles
Dutch Top 40 number-one singles
Number-one singles in New Zealand
Number-one singles in Switzerland
UK Singles Chart number-one singles
R. Kelly songs
Contemporary R&B ballads
Pop ballads
Bianca Ryan songs
James Ingram songs
Songs written by R. Kelly
Looney Tunes songs
Songs written for animated films
Space Jam
Basketball on NBC
Atlantic Records singles
Jive Records singles
Gospel songs
Song recordings produced by R. Kelly